The white-crowned cliff chat (Thamnolaea coronata) is a species of chat in the family Muscicapidae which occurs in rocky habitats in much of western Sub-Saharan Africa.

Description
There are three subspecies of which only the nominate subspecies has the white crown, which is also individually variable in extent and sometimes limited to a few white feathers. The males are black above with white shoulder epaulets. The epaulets are largest in the subspecies T. c. cavernicola, smaller in T. c. bambarae, and variable but sometimes absent in the nominate. Males of all subspecies have rufous plumage on the belly and vent. A pale bar separates the breast from the rest of the underparts on T. c. cavernicola, but is lacking on T. c. bambarae, and wider on the nominate subspecies, T. c. coronata. Additionally, T. c. cavernicola has a rufous rump. The females are similar to males but duller, lacking any white shoulder epaulets or a white band over the chest. The female of the nominate subspecies, T. c. coronata, has a paler head while the whole of her underpart plumage is rufous. Length is 20 cm.

Voice
A melodious rich and far-carrying song with many mimicked phrases; often pairs duet.

Distribution, subspecies and taxonomy
The three currently recognised subspecies are listed below with their distributions:

Thamnolaea coronata bambarae Bates, 1928 ― southern Mauritania, eastern Senegal, and southwestern Mali 
Thamnolaea coronata cavernicola Bates, 1933 ― central Mali in the Mopti region 
Thamnolaea coronata coronata Reichenow, 1902 ― northern Ivory Coast and eastern Burkina Faso east patchily to western South Sudan

It is sometimes considered a subspecies of the mocking cliff chat, especially since many male birds, including individuals of the nominate subspecies, T. c. coronata, do not have the distinctive white crown.

Habitat and habits 
The white-crowned cliff chat is found in inselbergs, cliffs, and escarpments in savanna.

Usually seen in pairs. Often slowly raises and lowers its tail, fanning it as it raises it vertically over the bird's back.

References

External links
 Recordings of white-crowned cliff chat at Xeno-Canto

white-crowned cliff chat
Birds of West Africa
white-crowned cliff chat